Being Rose is a 2017 American drama film by director Rod McCall about a dying woman who finds love while soul searching throughout the southwest during her final days. The film was released nationwide and on VOD by Gravitas Ventures on January 4, 2019.

Plot 
After being diagnosed with serious health issues, ex-cop Rose Jones (Cybill Shepherd), goes on a road trip in a wheelchair to search for her estranged son Will (Erik Fellows). The journey is punctuated with stays at health spas.  Along the way, she falls in love with Max (James Brolin), a handsome old cowboy, who has come to a crossroads of his own. However she returns home to spend her final weeks with her female friends. Max comes to see her and tries to take her to his ranch but she refuses to go.

Cast 
 Cybill Shepherd as Rose
 James Brolin as Max
 Pam Grier as Lily
 Amy Davidson as Ashley
 Julio Cedillo as Ernesto
 Cindy Pickett as karen
 Erik Fellows as Will

Film Festivals 
Being Rose was selected to world premiere as the opening night feature in the Lone Star Film Festival in Fort Worth Texas, November 7, 2017.

Release 
Gravitas Ventures gave the film a limited release on January 4, 2019. It was released via video on demand on the same day.

References

External links 
 

2017 films
2017 drama films
American independent films
American drama films
2010s English-language films
2017 independent films
2010s American films